Nitzschke is a surname. Notable people with the surname include:

Dale F. Nitzschke (born 1937), American academic
Ulrich Nitzschke (1933–2013), German boxer